Sir James Galbraith, 1st Baronet ( – 30 April 1827) was an Irish politician.

Biography
Galbraith was the son of James Galbraith, of Derry, by Elizabeth Whitehill, daughter of John Whitehill, of Clagh, County Londonderry. He represented Augher in the Irish House of Commons between 1798 and 1800. In 1813 he was created a baronet, of Shanevalley in the County of Donegall. Galbraith married Rebecca Dorothea Hamilton, daughter and co-heir of John Hamilton, of Castlefin. They had five daughters. He died in April 1827 when the title became extinct.

References

1827 deaths
Baronets in the Baronetage of the United Kingdom
Year of birth uncertain
Irish MPs 1798–1800
Members of the Parliament of Ireland (pre-1801) for County Tyrone constituencies